Luca de Meo (born 13 June 1967) is an Italian automotive executive who is currently the CEO of Renault.

Early life and education
Born in Milan in 1967 to parents originating from Locorotondo, de Meo received a degree in Business Administration from Bocconi University in Milan. In his thesis he examined business ethics, which was the first dissertation on this subject in Italy.

Career
De Meo has more than twenty-five years of experience in the automotive sector. He began his career at Renault, prior to joining Toyota Europe, followed by the Fiat Group, where he was head of the Lancia, Fiat and Alfa Romeo brands and CEO of Abarth. During his time as Fiat, he was considered a protégé of Sergio Marchionne, carrying a significant responsibility over the launch of the new Fiat 500, however, Marchionne was disappointed at his results while he was leading Alfa Romeo.

De Meo joined the Volkswagen Group in 2009, as marketing director of the brand of Volkswagen and of the Volkswagen Group, prior to taking up the position of board of management member for sales and marketing at Audi AG. He was president of SEAT from November 2015 to January 2020. In January 2020 it was announced that he would be the CEO of Renault effective July 2020, leaving Renault without a CEO for another five months due to a non-compete clause with Volkswagen Group.

De Meo speaks Italian, English, French, German and Spanish. He was a teaching fellow at SDA Bocconi School of Management, and is the author of the book Da 0 a 500, Storie vissute, idee e consigli da uno dei manager più dinamici della nuova generazione (From 0 to 500. Lived stories, ideas and advices from one [of] the most dynamic managers of the last generation).

In January 2021, de Meo presented "Renaulution", the new strategic plan for Groupe Renault, which aims to shift the strategy from volume to value.

Other activities
 Gruppo TIM, Independent Member of the Board of Directors

Awards and reception
In 2017, he was named Bocconi Alumnus of the Year, for representing the university values of professionalism, initiative, integrity, responsibility and openness to pluralism. His competences in leadership are said to be in marketing, product planning, having attention to detail and avoiding conflict, while he lacks an engineering background. His personality has been described as collegial, humorous and culturally adaptive.

De Meo was named "commendatore" by the Order of Merit of the Italian Republic, and Harvard University dedicated a case study to him in 2013, for his work in the Volkswagen Group as marketing director.

In March 2021, King Felipe VI of Spain awarded him with the Grand Cross of the Order of Isabella the Catholic.

Personal life
De Meo is married to Silvia Goracci and has two sons.

References

External links

Living people
Alfa Romeo people
1967 births
Businesspeople from Milan
Audi people
Italian chief executives
Renault people
Fiat people
Automotive businesspeople